Psychotria capensis, the bird-berry, is a southern African evergreen shrub or small tree. It belongs to a genus which is used medicinally in many regions, 'Psychotria' being from the Greek for 'rejuvenating', in reference to the healing properties of certain species. Kew lists some 2,000 species of Psychotria growing throughout the warmer regions of both hemispheres, but only two of them occur in southern Africa, namely P. capensis and P. zombamontana.

Range and habitat 
It occurs along the South African south and east coasts, from Knysna through the Eastern Cape and KwaZulu-Natal. It is also present in eastern Mpumalanga and Limpopo provinces and northwards in Zimbabwe and Mozambique. It is found from sea level to 1,500 m in evergreen forests, along forest margins, dune scrub, along river courses and on rocky outcrops in high rainfall grassland.

Description 

It grows to some 3 to 8 meters tall, and has a slender trunk, with horizontal branches and pale brown bark. The elliptic to obovate leaves are large (70-150 x 15-60 mm), leathery, glabrous, dark green above and paler below. They are opposite and often drooping. Yellow flowers are produced in terminal branched heads some 80 mm across from August to January, and are followed by bunches of pea-sized, shiny yellow fruits turning red or black when ripe. The wood is hard and fine-grained, yellowish-brown in colour.

References

External links 
Image of flowers

capensis